Pembrey is an unincorporated community in New Castle County, Delaware, United States. Pembrey is located south of Silverside Road and east of Shipley Road, east of Talleyville. Its name is drawn from Pembrey, a village in West Wales in the United Kingdom, which is itself an Anglicized version of Pen-Bre, meaning 'head of the mountain'.

References 

Unincorporated communities in New Castle County, Delaware
Unincorporated communities in Delaware